Besim Leka (born 17 October 1994) is an Albanian football player. He plays as a defender for Shkumbini Peqin football club in Albania's First Division.

References

1994 births
Living people
Footballers from Kavajë
Albanian footballers
Association football defenders
Besa Kavajë players
KS Shkumbini Peqin players
Kategoria e Parë players
Kategoria e Dytë players